Eklakhi  is a village in Chanditala II community development block of Srirampore subdivision in Hooghly district in the Indian state of West Bengal.

Geography
Chanditala police station serves this Village.

Gram panchayat
Villages and census towns in Garalgachha gram panchayat are: Eklakhi, Garalgachha and Krishnapur

Demographics
As per 2011 Census of India, Eklakhi had a total population of 1,783 of which 934 (52%) were males and 849 (48%) were females. Population below 6 years was 154. The total number of literates in Eklakhi was 1,222 (75.02% of the population over 6 years).

References 

Villages in Chanditala II CD Block